Catalina American Baptist Church (Catalina Baptist Church) is a historic church in Tucson, Arizona.  The original sanctuary there was built in 1960–1961.  Its "primary character-defining feature...is a thin-shell concrete hyperbolic paraboloid roof."  Its walls have floor-to-ceiling glass windows and aggregate concrete.

The church building features notable Modern Movement and Sculptural Expressionism style elements in its design.

A multi-purpose church complex was also built on the property, in 2005.

The building was added to the National Register of Historic Places in 2008.

The building is currently home to Christian Faith Fellowship - A Wesleyan Church.

See also

References

External links
Christian Faith Fellowship

Churches in Pima County, Arizona
Churches in Tucson, Arizona
Baptist churches in Arizona
National Register of Historic Places in Tucson, Arizona
Churches on the National Register of Historic Places in Arizona
Modernist architecture in Arizona
Modern Movement architecture in the United States